Surgeon Rear-Admiral Patterson David Gordon Pugh, OBE, FRCS (1920-1993), also known as Pat Pugh, was an orthopaedic surgeon in the Royal Navy and a prolific collector of Staffordshire portrait figures and naval ceramics.

Early life and training
Pugh was born in Carshalton, the son of William Thomas Gordon Pugh, a renowned paediatrician and Medical Superintendent of Queen Mary's Hospital for Children in Carshalton, Surrey. He was educated at Lancing College and Jesus College, Cambridge.

Career
Pugh pursued a successful career in the Royal Navy eventually rising to the rank of surgeon rear-admiral. In 1975 he was appointed an Honorary Surgeon to the Queen.

Ceramics collector
Pugh was a prolific collector of Staffordshire portrait figures and naval ceramics amassing a collection of over 5,000 pieces. in 1970 he loaned the collection to the Potteries Museum & Art Gallery in Stoke-on-Trent. This arrangement continued until 1980 when Pugh emigrated to South Africa and he offered to sell the collection to the museum. With the aid of grants, donations and an appeal fund the collection was purchased, and became known as The Pugh Collection of Victorian Staffordshire Figures. His book "Staffordshire Portrait Figures and Allied Subjects of the Victorian Era" became the standard work on the
subject.

Personal life
Pugh is the father of endurance swimmer and ocean advocate Lewis Pugh.

Pugh is a descendant of Baptist missionary William Carey. His cousin, Carey Heydenrych, participated in the "Great Escape" from the German POW camp Stalag Luft III during the Second World War.

Writing
P.D. Gordon Pugh. Nelson and his surgeons E. & S. Livingstone, Edinburgh, 1968
P.D. Gordon Pugh. Naval Ceramics. The Ceramic Book Co., Newport, England, 1971.
P.D. Gordon Pugh. The History of the Royal Naval Hospital, Plymouth. I. The life and times of Captain Richard Creyke. J R Nav Med Serv. 1972 Summer;58(2):78-94.
P.D. Gordon Pugh. ''The History of the Royal Naval Hospital, Plymouth. II. 'A walk around the Hospital.' J R Nav Med Serv. 1972 Winter;58(3):207-26.

References

External links
  http://www.hlf.org.uk/NHMFWeb/Database/datapage2.html?projectid=890
  http://www.stoke.gov.uk/ccm/museums/museum/2006/collections/ceramics/information-sheets/staffordshire-portrait-figures.en;jsessionid=aG3vosIDuVL8

20th-century births
Living people
People educated at Lancing College
Alumni of Jesus College, Cambridge
Royal Navy rear admirals
Officers of the Order of the British Empire
Fellows of the Royal College of Surgeons
English surgeons
Royal Navy Medical Service officers
Year of birth missing (living people)
British emigrants to South Africa